Andrah Kalan is a village in the Chakswari tehsil of Mirpur District of Azad Kashmir, Pakistan.

Demography 

According to 1998 census of Pakistan, its population was 1,003.

History 

Like in many villages in the Mirpur region, people of many villages have immigrated to the United Kingdom.
Andrah Kalan is known for having one of its sons Choudhry Lal Hussain elected as the Chair of Mirpur district Council. 

It is also home to the Haji Mohammed Iqbal son of the late Haji Abdul Majid and his 4 brothers (Mohammed Yunis, Mohammed Azam, Mohammed Razaq and Mohammed Ramzan) who have invested in property in Islamgarh Bazaar known as the 'yaaraa lakhy market' in the late 1980's. The family/brothers moved to Huddersfield in United Kingdom in the early mid 1960's to join head of the family Haji Abdul Majid who had settled earlier, the family moved to Glasgow in the 1970's and opened up a family grocery business. Mohammed Razaq has had the honour of being an elected Councillor for the Labour Party (2003 to 2017) and also served as a Bailie for Glasgow City Council, United Kingdom. Mohammed Razaq also works as the Executive Director of the West of Scotland Regional Equality Council ( www.wsrec.co.uk ) which offers support and advice to ethnic minorities communities on equality, he initially joined as a volunteer in 1998 after graduating in BA in Business Administration (Majoring in Computing). Mohammed Razaq has also been supporting Punjab Rescue Services 1122 since its inception with the provision of Equality Training for senior officers in 2018 in Lahore. The family are heavily involved in charitable work in Glasgow and Azad Kashmir. Haji Mohammed Iqbal is a founder and now a volunteer with Islamgarh  Welfare Trust an NGO based in Islamgarh providing health care for the poor and needy). Youngest brother Mohammed Ramzan is the Chair of Vision Again Foundation (previous name Vision Again Association) which works to provide free eye care for the vulnerable and have offices in Glasgow and Islamgarh.

References 

Populated places in Mirpur District